Donald Cameron may refer to:

Scottish Clan Cameron
 Donald Cameron of Lochiel (c. 1695 or 1700–1748), 19th Chief, and his descendants:
 Donald Cameron, 22nd Lochiel (1769–1832), 22nd Chief
 Donald Cameron of Lochiel (1835–1905), Scottish Conservative politician
 Donald Walter Cameron of Lochiel (1876–1951), 25th Chief
 Donald Hamish Cameron of Lochiel (1910–2004), 26th Chief
 Donald Cameron (Scottish politician) (born 1976), member of the Scottish Parliament and son of the 27th Chief
 Taillear Dubh na Tuaighe (c. 1550–?), Donald Cameron, illegitimate son of 13th chief; descendants are members of Taylor sept

Australian politicians
 Donald Cameron (Tasmanian politician) (1814–1890), Tasmanian MLC 1868–86, father of Donald Norman Cameron
 Donald Alastair Cameron (1900–1974), Liberal Party of Australia MHR for Oxley, Queensland, 1949–1961
 Donald Charles Cameron (politician) (1879–1960), Nationalist Party of Australia MHR for Brisbane, Queensland, 1919–1931, United Australia Party MHR for Lilley, Queensland, 1934–1937
 Donald Keith Cameron (1887–1967), Nationalist Party of Australia Tasmanian MHA for Wilmot, Tasmania, 1934–1937, son of Donald Norman Cameron
 Don Cameron (Queensland Labor politician) (Donald James Cameron, 1917–1964), Australian Labor Party MHR for Lilley, Queensland, 1961–1963
 Don Cameron (Queensland Liberal politician) (Donald Milner Cameron, born 1940), Liberal Party of Australia MHR for Griffith, Queensland, 1966–1977, for Fadden, Queensland, 1977–1983, for Moreton, Queensland, 1983–1990
 Don Cameron (South Australian politician) (Donald Newton Cameron, 1914–1998), Australian Labor Party Senator for South Australia, 1969–1978
 Don Cameron (Victorian politician) (Donald James Cameron, 1878–1962), Australian Labor Party Senator for Victoria, 1938–1962
 Norman Cameron (politician) (Donald Norman Cameron, 1851–1931), Free Trade Party MHR for Tasmania 1901–1903, for Wilmot, Tasmania, 1904–1906

Canadian politicians
 Donald Cameron Sr. (1869–1936), Member of the Alberta Legislative Assembly, 1921–1935
 Donald Cameron (Alberta politician) (1901–1989), Senator from Alberta and the son of Donald Cameron Sr.
 Donald Cameron (Prince Edward Island politician) (c. 1836–after 1882), Member of the Legislative Assembly
 Donald Mackenzie Cameron (1843–1920), Scottish-born merchant, journalist and political figure in Ontario, Canada
 Donald Niel Cameron (1917–2014), Member of Parliament from British Columbia
 Donald Cameron (Nova Scotia premier) (born 1946), Premier of Nova Scotia
 Don Cameron (Saskatchewan politician), Green Party of Canada candidate from Saskatchewan

Other politicians
 J. Donald Cameron (1833–1918), United States Senator from Pennsylvania
 Donald Charles Cameron (colonial administrator) (1872–1948), governor of Nigeria and Tanganyika
 Donald Cameron (mayor) (1877–1962), mayor of Dunedin, New Zealand

Entertainment
 Angus Cameron (publisher) (Donald Angus Cameron, 1908–2002), American book editor and publisher
 Donald Clough Cameron (1905–1954), American novelist and comic book writer
 D. J. Cameron (Donald John Cameron, 1933–2016), New Zealand journalist and sportswriter
 Silver Donald Cameron (1937–2020), Canadian author and educator
 Robin Bryans (1928–2005), Belfast-born writer also known as Donald Cameron
 Donald Cameron (EastEnders), a character in British soap opera EastEnders

Sports
 Donald Cameron (cricketer) (1908–1990), New Zealand cricketer
 Donald Cameron (rugby union, born 1887) (1887–1947), rugby player from New Zealand
 Donald Cameron (rugby union, born 1927) (1927–2003), rugby union player from Scotland
 Don Cameron (footballer) (born 1931), Australian footballer for Melbourne
 Gregory Duncan Cameron, known as Don, racehorse trainer
 Donald Cameron (water polo) (born 1954), Australian water polo player

Other
 Donald Cameron (architect) (1894–1972), Scottish architect
 Donald Ewen Cameron (1901–1967), Scottish-American psychiatrist
 Donald Cameron (VC) (1916–1961), Victoria Cross recipient in 1943
 Donald Cameron (bishop) (born 1926), in the Anglican Diocese of Sydney
 Don Cameron (balloonist) (born 1939), British balloon manufacturer
 Donald Cameron, the captain of Air Canada Flight 797

See also
 Cameron (surname)